The Parapara River is a river of the Tasman Region of New Zealand's South Island. It flows generally north from its watershed in the Kahurangi National Park, reaching Golden Bay at the small settlement of Parapara, 5 kilometres south of Collingwood.

In Māori tradition, the river is inhabited by a taniwha called Kaiwhakaruaki, who used to attack the people of Motueka and Tākaka. This tradition derives from Society Islands in Polynesia, where a monstrous shark called 'Aifa'arua'i (a cognate of Kaiwhakaruaki) is said to have lived in the Parapara Strait between Motue'a and Taha'a islands (cognates of Motueka and Tahaka).

See also
List of rivers of New Zealand

References

Rivers of the Tasman District
Kahurangi National Park
Rivers of New Zealand